Simon Stadler (born 20 July 1983 in Heidelberg, West Germany) is a German retired professional left-handed tennis player. He reached his career-high singles ranking of world No. 140 in February 2009 and his career-high doubles ranking of world No. 52 in February 2014.

Juniors career 
Stadler reached a career-high of No. 8 in singles in February 2001 and No. 14 in doubles in January 2001.

Professional career

2008 
After a slow start to the year, Stadler reached Challenger semifinals two weeks in a row in Cremona and Athens to reach his career-high ranking of No. 164 in April. He reached another semifinal in Telde in May.

In June, Stadler qualified in singles for the 2008 Wimbledon Championships, beating British junior No. 949 Daniel Cox (a week after Cox knocked off No. 67 Thomaz Bellucci), No. 248 Rainer Eitzinger and No. 270 Nicolás Todero. He took this form into the main singles draw, where he faced the 18th seed Ivo Karlović from Croatia and beat him in four sets. He then defeated the aforementioned Brazilian, Thomaz Bellucci in the second round, 8–6 in the fifth. He would go on to lose to Cypriot Marcos Baghdatis in the third round.

ATP career finals

Doubles: 3 (1–2)

Performance timelines

Singles

Doubles

References

External links
 
 

1983 births
German male tennis players
Sportspeople from Heidelberg
Living people
Tennis people from Baden-Württemberg
21st-century German people